Sébékoro is a small town and a rural commune in the Cercle of Kita in the Kayes Region of south-western Mali. The commune includes the town and 15 villages. In the 2009 census the commune had a population of 39,030.

References

External links
.

Communes of Kayes Region